Degache, also spelled Degueche, is a Tunisian town and commune situated in the region of Djerid, and part of Tozeur Governorate. It had a population of 14,332 in 2014, and is the biggest town of a delegation bearing its name.

History
Degache began as an oasis exploited since Roman antiquity. The ancient city of Thagis is situated a few kilometres away.

Geography
The town is located on the northern shore of the salt lake Chott el Djerid, 12 km east of Tozeur and 92 km west of Gafsa.

Tourism
The economy of the town is centred on the exploitation of a rich palm plantation, producing deglet nour dates. A centre for phœnicicoles research has been located there. Degache has also 2 industrial areas. It's also increasingly included in south Tunisian Saharan tourist circuits.

Transport
Degache has a railway station on the Gafsa-Tozeur line, part of the Tunisian Railways (SNCFT) network. It is served by the national highways RN3 and RN16, the second one crossing the Chott el Djerid to reach Douz. Nearest airport, 13 km far, is Tozeur–Nefta International Airport.

See also
List of cities in Tunisia

References

External links

Populated places in Tozeur Governorate
Communes of Tunisia
Catholic titular sees in Africa
Roman towns and cities in Tunisia